is a passenger railway station located in Kōhoku-ku, Yokohama, Kanagawa Prefecture, Japan, operated by the East Japan Railway Company (JR East).

Lines
Many services continue west of Higashi-Kanagawa via the Negishi Line to  during the offpeak, and to  during the morning peak.

Station layout 
The station consists of a single island platform and a side platform serving three elevated tracks, with the station building underneath.  The station is staffed.

Platforms

History 
Kozukue Station was opened on 23 September 1908 as a  station on the privately held Yokohama Railway Company. The line was acquired by the Japanese government in 1910, and merged into the Japanese Government Railways system (the predecessor to the JNR) from October 1, 1917. The station building was destroyed in the 1923 Great Kantō earthquake and rebuilt in 1925.  All freight operations were suspended from 1972. With the privatization of the JNR on 1 April 1987, the station came under the operational control of JR East. A new station building was completed in 1998.

Station numbering was introduced to the Yokohama Line platforms 20 August 2016 with Kozukue being assigned station number JH17.

Passenger statistics
In fiscal 2019, the station was used by an average of 10,345 passengers daily (boarding passengers only).

The passenger figures (boarding passengers only) for previous years are as shown below.

See also
 List of railway stations in Japan

References

External links

 

Railway stations in Kanagawa Prefecture
Railway stations in Japan opened in 1908
Yokohama Line
Stations of East Japan Railway Company
Railway stations in Yokohama